Milan Radin is a politician in Serbia. He was elected to the National Assembly of Serbia in the 2020 Serbian parliamentary election. Radin is a member of the Serbian Progressive Party.

Early life and private career
Radin was born in Belgrade, in what was then the Socialist Republic of Serbia in the Socialist Federal Republic of Yugoslavia. He has a degree from the Faculty of European Legal and Political Science in Novi Sad and subsequently received a Master of Business Administration degree. He has been the executive director of Mala Mlekara and now lives in Novi Sad.

Politician
Radin has been a member of the Progressive Party's Youth Union. In 2018, he took part in a Progressive Party delegation to a meeting of the European People's Party in Athens, Greece.

Municipal politics
Radin received the seventy-fourth position on the Progressive Party's electoral list for the Novi Sad municipal assembly in the 2012 Serbian local elections and was not returned when the list won fifteen mandates. He was promoted to the fifty-second position in the 2016 local elections and was again not elected when the list won thirty-eight seats.

Parliamentarian
Radin received the eighty-eighth position on the Progressive Party's Aleksandar Vučić — For Our Children coalition list in the 2020 Serbian parliamentary election and was elected when the list won a landslide majority with 188 mandates. He is now a member of the European integration committee; a deputy member of the committee on education, science, technological development, and the information society; a member of the subcommittee on the information society and digitalization; a substitute member of the Serbia's delegation to the Parliamentary Assembly of the Council of Europe; the leader of Serbia's parliamentary friendship group with South Africa; and a member of the parliamentary friendship groups with Argentina, Austria, Belgium, Brazil, Canada, China, Cuba, Cyprus, the Czech Republic, Denmark, Finland, France, Georgia, Germany, Greece, Hungary, Ireland, Israel, Italy, Japan, Malta, the Netherlands, North Macedonia, Norway, Poland, Russia, Slovakia, South Korea, Spain, Sweden, Switzerland, Turkey, the United Kingdom, and the United States of America.

References

1988 births
Living people
Politicians from Novi Sad
Members of the National Assembly (Serbia)
Substitute Members of the Parliamentary Assembly of the Council of Europe
Serbian Progressive Party politicians